Kennington Railway Bridge is a railway bridge over the River Thames near Kennington, Oxfordshire between Sandford Lock and Iffley Lock. It carries the freight railway branch line that serves the BMW Mini factory at Cowley.

The current bridge was built for the Great Western Railway in 1923. The bridge crosses the river askew.

Earlier bridge and replacement
The current bridge replaces a five-span plate girder bridge built for the Wycombe Railway in 1863. In 1914 Great Western Railway engineers noted that some of the screw piles of the old bridge had settled slightly. They wanted to replace the bridge but were prevented by the First World War. Therefore, with the consent of the Thames Conservancy, the GWR shored up the bridge with wooden trestles resting on foundations of bagged cement until the end of wartime restrictions would allow the bridge to be replaced.

In 1923 the new bridge was built parallel to the old one. The GWR had it designed in-house, but contracted its construction to George Palmer of Neath, Glamorgan. The Horseley Bridge and Engineering Co Ltd of Tipton was subcontracted to make the six bowstrings for the three new spans.

The GWR transported each completed bowstring from Tipton to Kennington by rail on a pair of Pollen C four-wheeled wagons. At the bridge site each bowstring was lifted into place by two rail-mounted 36-ton cranes. When the new bridge was completed, the railway was realigned for a distance of  either side to cross the new bridge. The old bridge was then dismantled and its piers and temporary trestles demolished.

Halt
At the western end of the bridge is the site of the former Iffley Halt railway station.

See also

Crossings of the River Thames

References

Sources

Bridges across the River Thames
Bridges completed in 1923
Bridges in Oxford
Railway bridges in Oxfordshire
1923 establishments in England